Canada World View (ISSN 1491-4573) was a quarterly magazine published by the Canadian Department of Foreign Affairs and International Trade from 1998 until the spring of 2006. It described itself as providing "an overview of Canada's perspective on foreign policy issues and highlights the "Government of Canada's international initiatives and contributions." The magazine was published in French and English languages. The headquarters was in Ottawa, Ontario.

References

External links
 Canada World View, official website

1998 establishments in Ontario
2006 disestablishments in Ontario
Quarterly magazines published in Canada
Defunct political magazines published in Canada
English-language magazines
French-language magazines published in Canada
Magazines established in 1998
Magazines disestablished in 2006
Magazines published in Ottawa